Vebjørn Walnum Vinje (born 7 April 1995) is a Norwegian footballer who plays as a defender for Stjørdals-Blink.

Club career
Vinje was born in Nesna. He made his senior debut for Nesna IL on the fifth tier in 2011, before moving in autumn to attend the Norwegian School of Elite Sport in Bærum. He briefly joined the youth ranks of Stabæk before fielding in the 2012 season for Bærum. Ahead of the 2013 season he quit his school, moved back to Nesna and started playing for the regional greats Mo IL. He joined Bodø/Glimt in the summer of 2014, but in the remainder of the season he only played as far as their B team.

He made his senior debut for Bodø/Glimt on 8 November 2015 against Stabæk; Bodø/Glimt won 6–1.

On 1 April, he joined Mo on loan. On 20 August 2017 he joined Byåsen after moving to Trondheim to study at the NTNU, and in 2018 he moved on to another Trondheim club Nardo.

In the summer of 2019 he went on to third third club in the Trondheim region, Stjørdals-Blink.

Career statistics

Club

References

1995 births
Living people
People from Nesna
Norwegian footballers
Eliteserien players
Association football defenders
FK Bodø/Glimt players
Byåsen Toppfotball players
IL Stjørdals-Blink players
Sportspeople from Nordland